"Homecoming" is the fifth episode of the third season of the television series Buffy the Vampire Slayer. It was written and directed by David Greenwalt, and first broadcast on November 3, 1998.

Old enemies have returned to kill the slayers and when Cordelia is mistaken for Faith, she has to help Buffy fight for their lives.

Plot 
Scott breaks up with Buffy the day after asking her to the homecoming dance. Buffy continues to feed a weak Angel in secret, telling him the others would not understand that he is now better.

At school, Buffy is monitored by two men in a van that are somehow connected to Mr. Trick. They overhear Buffy mention that a limo will pick up both her and Faith to take them to the homecoming dance. The gang sends Cordelia to remind Buffy that yearbook photos are about to take place, but Cordelia is too busy campaigning for Homecoming Queen. After discovering that her favorite teacher does not remember her, and that it was Cordelia's fault that she missed yearbook photos, Buffy decides to compete for the Homecoming Queen title.

Meanwhile, Trick introduces a competition, "SlayerFest '98", with a group of participants including German twin assassins Hans and Fredrick Gruenstahler, "The Most Dangerous Game" hunter Frawley, Kulak, a demon of the Miquot Clan, and Lyle Gorch and his new wife Candy. When Xander and Willow try on their homecoming outfits, tension builds until they finally kiss.

On homecoming night, Buffy is collected by a limo containing Cordelia instead of Faith. Cordelia gives Buffy a note from the rest of the gang who hope that Buffy and Cordelia will make up. Upon exiting the limo, the girls find themselves isolated in a remote location. They find a video tape message, addressed to Buffy and Faith, detailing the hunting of the slayers in SlayerFest '98. The participants attack and after Buffy defeats Frawley, the girls seek shelter in a cabin.

Buffy and Cordelia find a phone and attempt to alert Giles to their situation, but the phone is soon cut dead. They begin to bond when Cordelia admits that she loves Xander and Buffy reveals that she spent a year's allowance on her dress. Kulak arrives and fights with Buffy until the German assassins fire a grenade into the cabin. Buffy and Cordelia escape back to the library, but Kulak is killed.

Upon arriving at the library, Buffy and Cordelia find Giles has been knocked unconscious by Lyle and Candy. Buffy manages to stake Candy, but is knocked out in the process. Cordelia then scares off Lyle by persuading him that she is a bigger threat than Buffy. When Buffy and Giles regain consciousness, they discover the tracking devices in the corsages. Buffy distracts the German assassins as they enter the school, managing to plant the trackers on them and have them annihilate each other with their high-tech equipment. Trick is escorted to the Mayor's office, who recruits him to help control the rebellious youth of Sunnydale. Buffy and Cordelia finally arrive at the homecoming dance to find that neither of them won the title.

Reception

"Homecoming" was criticized by Bryan Senn for concentrating too much on Buffy's self-pity, which prompts her to campaign to be Homecoming Queen. It leaves little time for the hunting-humans-as-sport storyline, a twist on the theme of Richard Connell's 1924 short story "The Most Dangerous Game" and its 1932 film adaptation of the same name.

References

External links 

 

Buffy the Vampire Slayer (season 3) episodes
1998 American television episodes
Television episodes written by David Greenwalt
Fiction about death games